Insulin degludec (INN/USAN) is an ultralong-acting basal insulin analogue that was developed by Novo Nordisk under the brand name Tresiba.  It is administered via subcutaneous injection once daily to help control the blood sugar level of those with diabetes. It has a duration of action that lasts up to 42 hours (compared to 18 to 26 hours provided by other marketed long-acting insulins such as insulin glargine and insulin detemir), making it a once-daily basal insulin, that is one that provides a base insulin level, as opposed to the fast- and short-acting bolus insulins.

Insulin degludec is a modified insulin that has one single amino acid deleted in comparison to human insulin, and is conjugated to hexadecanedioic acid via gamma-L-glutamyl spacer at the amino acid lysine at position B29.

It is included in the World Health Organization's List of Essential Medicines as an equivalent to insulin glargine. In 2020, it was the 136th most commonly prescribed medication in the United States, with more than 4million prescriptions.

Side effects
A significant side effect of insulin therapy is hypoglycemia.  A meta-analysis of clinical trials published in July 2012 found 39 to 47.9 events of hypoglycemia (defined as blood glucose <56 mg/dL) per patient year, with higher rates in the more concentrated degludec formulation.  Rates of nocturnal hypoglycemia ranged from 3.7 to 5.1 events per patient year. A more recent Cochrane systematic review found there was no significant differences in rates of diurnal, nocturnal hypoglycemia or any other studies outcomes when using insulin degludec as compared to insulin glargine, insulin detemir and NPH insulin for the management of type I Diabetes in neither adults nor children.

Pharmacology

Mechanism of action
Insulin degludec is an ultra-long acting insulin that, unlike insulin glargine, is active at a physiologic pH.  The addition of hexadecanedioic acid via an amide linkage to lysine at the B29 position allows for the formation of multi-hexamers in subcutaneous tissues.  This allows for the formation of a subcutaneous depot that results in slow insulin release into the systemic circulation.

Pharmacokinetics
Insulin degludec has an onset of action of 30–90 minutes (similar to insulin glargine and insulin detemir).  There is no peak in activity, due to the slow release into systemic circulation.  The duration of action of insulin degludec is reported as being longer than 24 hours.

Because the half-life is longer than 24 hours, it is approved for daily dosing at any time each day - as long as more than 8 hours has elapsed since the previous dose. A missed dose is advised to be taken as soon as remembered, then return to a normal schedule.

Effectiveness profile
Studies have shown that patients taking insulin degludec needed to take significantly smaller doses of basal insulin than those taking insulin glargine U100, while achieving similar blood glucose levels. However, in a recent Cochrane systematic review no clinically significant differences in measures of effectiveness were found when using insulin degludec as compared to insulin glargine, insulin detemir and NPH insulin for the management of type I Diabetes in neither adults nor children.  Insulin degludec also has the ability to be mixed with other insulins, thereby improving glycemic control. This cannot be done using current long-acting insulins. A physician involved in the trials was quoted as saying,

History
Insulin degludec has been filed for registration in the United States.  After the completion of additional cardiac safety studies requested by the U.S. Food and Drug Administration (FDA) in February 2013, it received FDA approval 25 September 2015 and marketing began on 26 January 2016.

Clinical trial data

Type 1 diabetes mellitus
Insulin degludec was studied as an alternative to insulin glargine as part of a basal-bolus regimen in the BEGIN Basal-Bolus Type 1 trial.  629 patients with type 1 diabetes were randomized in a 3:1 ratio to either insulin degludec (n=472) or insulin glargine (n=157) in addition to mealtime insulin aspart.  Patients in the degludec treatment arm were switched from their basal insulin to insulin degludec in a 1:1 ratio, with a 20-30% dose reduction in patients receiving multiple basal doses per day.  After 52 weeks, patients treated with insulin degludec produced a similar reduction in HbA1c (0.40% vs. 0.39%) meeting the criteria for noninferiority.  Adverse events were similar in the two treatment arms; however, rates of nocturnal hypoglycemia (between midnight and 6am) were 27% lower in patients treated with insulin degludec (3.91 vs. 5.22%,p=0.024).  The reduction in the incidence of hypoglycemia was seen as a therapeutic benefit, as hypoglycemia is often a dose limiting toxicity in insulin therapy.

A Cochrane systematic review has compared the use of insulin degludec to that of insulin glargine, insulin detemir and NPH insulin in adults and children diagnosed with type I Diabetes. This review included Randomized Control Trials (RCTs) with a duration of 24 to 104 weeks and had a total sample of 8784 participants randomized across studies: 2428 participants allocated to NPH insulin; 2889 participants to insulin detemir; 2095 participants to insulin glargine; 1372 participants to insulin degludec. 21% of all participants were children. No studies directly compared insulin degludec with NPH insulin. In the studies comparing insulin degludec to insulin detemir (2 RCTs) and insulin degludec to insulin glargine (4 RCTs), no clinically relevant difference was found for the outcomes of all-cause mortality, health-related quality of life (QoL), severe hypoglycemia, non-fatal myocardial infarction/stroke (NFMI/NFS), severe nocturnal hypoglycaemia, serious adverse effects (SAE) and Glycosated haemoglobin A1c (HbA1c).

Type 2 diabetes mellitus
In the BEGIN Basal-Bolus Type 2 trial, insulin degludec was studied as an alternative to insulin glargine in patients with type 2 diabetes mellitus. 995 patients were randomized to receive either insulin degludec (n=755) or insulin glargine (n=251), in addition to either mealtime insulin aspart, metformin, and/or pioglitazone.  Patients in this trial had an average HbA1c of 8.3–8.4%, and 49–50% were on a regimen consisting of basal-bolus insulin plus oral antidiabetic medications.  After 52 weeks, insulin degludec was found to be noninferior to insulin glargine, providing a similar HbA1c lowering effect (−1.10 vs. −1.18%).  Overall rates of hypoglycemia were significantly lower with insulin degludec (11.09 vs. 13.63%/yr, p=0.0359), including cases of nocturnal hypoglycemia (1.39 vs. 1.84%/yr, p=0.0399).

Pharmacoeconomics
Given the treat-to-target nature of the BEGIN trial program, much of the health economic analysis of insulin degludec has focussed on short-term cost-effectiveness based on differences in insulin dosing and hypoglycemic event incidence rather than differences in glycemic control. The first cost-effectiveness analysis of this nature was conducted from a societal perspective in the Swedish setting in 2013, finding that insulin degludec would be cost-effective relative to insulin glargine in the treatment of type 1 diabetes, and type 2 diabetes as part of either a basal or basal-insulin regimen.

See also
 Insulin icodec
 Insulin glargine

References

External links 
 

Human proteins
Insulin receptor agonists
Insulin therapies
Peptide hormones
Recombinant proteins